The Bandini 750 international sport also called simply "Saponetta", is a racing car built from 1957 until 1961 by Bandini Cars.

This new type of car, prepared for the 750 sports category, replaced the "Sport Torpedo". The adjective "International" pays tribute to the merits collected overseas by the 750 sports torpedo, while "Saponetta" (little bar of soap) was its nickname courtesy of Ilario Bandini for its form, similar to that of a simple bar of soap.

As the model which replaced the bar of soap, it was much in demand in the United States where it was used both as auto racing that as "out of range" to be submitted to the streets in the city.
Its debut in racing dates back to Mille Miglia, 1957  led by Bruno Garavini, with a  Bandini-Crosley (second series) updated especially in the head (identifiable by the distributor mounted between the two camshafts and the cam covers inclined at 45° with pronounced longitudinal ribs).

The "Saponetta", maintained the characteristics of simplicity and lightness while improving road holding and reducing drag, features which were exploited in motordromes such as the Daytona circuit and the high-speed Monza circuit.

The story 
These updates proved fast and successful, able to sustain high RPMs even with higher displacements, collecting victories up until 1965 with Gene Parsons, James Eichenlaub (both ex aequo vicechampion U.S. SCCA in 1958), Dave Lang (third in the final classification 1961 with only four races: three first and second place), Skip Callanan, Paul Richards, Victor Lukens, Jack Connolly, Giorgio Cecchini, and Ilario Bandini. These later wins were most impressive, given that many car competitors had mid-rear engines, a choice destined to spread throughout motorsports. In this context, the most important results are third place to Trento-Bondone in 1964 (valid for the European championship mountain) and fourth place to Mugello circuit road, 1965 (Round of World Championship sport cars) both times driven by Antonio Benelli.

Today, nine "Saponetta" remained, one is exhibited in the museum Marconi Los Angeles, two are stored in the museum Bandini Forlì.

The chassis 

The chassis construction of the Saponetta, while using the same elements as in the "750 Torpedo", changes in size and weight distribution.
Increased wheelbase and track width, significantly reduced ground clearance, and considerable lowering of driver position were all accomplished. The engine compartment was enlarged, allowing the housing of the subsequent 850 and 1000 cc engines.
The rear suspension has been enhanced with an anti-roll and, in some cases, replaced with independent rear suspension.

 Structure and material: frame of elliptical section tubes, special steel aeronautics derivation; patent No. 499843
 Wheelbase: 2100 mm
 Suspension:
 Front: Independent, triangles overlapping with shock hydraulic telescopic tilted and springs cylindrical helical coaxial; bar Account
 Rear: a bridge with two rigid leaf spring semiellittiche longitudinal and shock vertical telescopic hydraulic, anti-tramp
 Braking system:
 Service: hydraulics, ventilated drum front and lightened
 Parking Mechanical band, on transmission shaft
 
 Steering: a worm with vibration damper on shaft
 Drive:  left (right upon request)
 Wheels: Borrani Ray 15" or 12"
 Tyres: 4.25x15 / 5.20x12 "
 Fuel tank: 
 Transmission: rear shaft with central differential
 Weight: bare chassis 
 Weight total: -
 Speed maximum:  (750 cc),  (1000 cc)

Engines
The Saponetta was born with the engine Bandini-Crosley 750 cc but from 1959 was also used with engines 850 cc and 1000, the first engines built completely with Bandini the transmission chain, whose project is dated 1955. There are also copies that are running with engines Saab and Ford.

Bandini Crosley 750-second series

 Layout: front longitudinal, 4-cylinder in-line
 Materials and particularity: base 5 media bench and alloy sump of 5 litres capacity, Head alloy DOHC, Distribution gear double overhead camshaft, 8 inclined valves, cylinders detachable ironcasted block.
 Bore: 
 Stroke: 
 Displacement: 747 cc
 Compression ratio: 9,4:1
 Power: 2 Weber carburetors double body 35DCO3
 Lubricate: Carter with wet gear pump and filter external wire mesh, alloy cooler
 Cooling: forced liquid with centrifugal pump controlled by pulley and belt, cooler on the front
 Gearbox and clutch: 4 speed + RG, clutch single dry disc
 Ignition and electrical equipment: coil and distributor on the head, battery 12 V and generator

Bandini 1000

 Layout: front longitudinal, 4-cylinder in-line
 Materials and particularity: double camshaft transmission of motion a chain and gears, Alloy head with hemispherical chambers, alloy block and a five-bearing alloy crankshaft. Sump in reeds of cylinders in ironcasted chrome and detachable
 Bore: 
 Stroke: 
 Displacement: 987 cc
 Compression ratio: 9,5:1
 Power: 2 Weber carburetors double body 38DCO3
 Power: 90 CV at 7200 rpm
 Lubricate: Carter with wet gear pump and filter external radiator in aluminium
 Cooling: forced liquid with centrifugal pump controlled by pulley and belt, cooler
 Gearbox and clutch: 4 speed +RG, clutch single dry disc
 Ignition and electrical equipment: coil and distributor on the head, battery 12 V and generator

The body 

The bodywork in aluminium open two-seater (little boat) are built in Forlì by Bandini. Since the first example was built, the design underwent some radical changes: in the first version appeared laterally two vertical fins, some have a truncated tail, in the final model is elongated, low and clean. The front instead appears definitive if not minor differences in the form of air-intake front, a composition of an ellipsoid and a half circle. Significant between a model and the other is the air vent hot side of the engine compartment, sometimes rectangular smoothed trapezoid, parallelogram single or double. Always an air directed inside the (cylindrical opening with about half side) characterizes the car with which he ran Ilario Bandini.

The height and shape of the windshield varies considerably between cars, while a removable fairing could be mounted on the rear of the cockpit to reduce aerodynamic drag. The same attention was paid to the rear wheels that could be half-covered with spats. In this respect is curious to see how the rule which introduced the use of roll-bar may have been exploited to create a fairing which seems to have the function of a wing.

External links

 Short video on board

Bandini vehicles
Sports racing cars
1960s cars
Cars introduced in 1957